James Packard may refer to:

James Ward Packard (1863–1928), American automobile manufacturer
Jim Packard (1931–1960), American automobile racer
Jim Packard (radio host) (1942–2012), American radio producer and host